Deepak Parashar (born 2 April 1952) is an Indian actor and former model. He was a contestant on Bigg Boss in 2006.

Early life
He was born in Pune, India on 2 April 1952 to Shobha and Vishvanath Parashar. He was married in 1985 to Sarita and has a daughter Radhika.

Career
Deepak Parashar appeared in the soap opera Kahiin To Hoga, and donned the "royal robes" of a Mughal badshah in the costume drama Chandramukhi.

In 1976, he was crowned very first Mr India/India Prince (A Personality Contest) along with Nafisa Ali as Miss India and Poonam Dhillon as Miss Delhi. His claim to fame was "ONLY VIMAL" suitings in
the late 70's,. New Delhi donned his photograph.  In the early 1980s, Parashar took several Hindi cinema roles, including Sharaabi, Insaaf Ka Tarazu, Nikaah, Purani Haveli and Aap to Aise Na They. Till date Nikaah remains his best performing movie and Insaaf ka Tarazu one of the best supporting roles he played. In 2006, he appeared in reality TV show Bigg Boss, until he was evicted in the second week. He also appeared in Doordarshan TV serial Swabhiman as Mahendra Malhotra.

Filmography

T.V. Serials

 Neem Neem Shahad Shahad (2011) as Chiman Bhai
 Chandramukhi (2007) as Raja Mahendra Pratap Singh
 Bigg Boss 1 (2006) as Participant 
 Kahiin to Hoga (2003) as Chetan Garewal
 Dollar Bahu (2001) as Father in Law
 Rishtey - Kashish (2000)  
 Hello Friends (1999)  
 Kabhi Kabhi (1997) as Nirmal Joshi
 Saturday Suspense (1997)  
 Tamanna (1997)
 Kanoon (1995) as Deepak Dasgupta
 Swabhimaan (1995) as Mahendra Malhotra
 Deewarein (1995) 
 Tujh Pe Dil Qurban (1995) 
 Chandrakanta (1994) 
 Raat Ki Pukar (1994)
 Zee Horror Show - Aafat (1994)
 Aandhiyan (1993)

Movies

 Jaise Karni Vaisi Bharni (2007)
 Yeh Lamhe Judaai Ke (2004) 
 Champion (2000) as Nawab Mansoor Ali Khan
 Hai kaun Woh (1999) 
 Barood (1998) 
 Hatya Kaand (1998)
 Aaj Ka Maseeha (1995)
 Aaja Re O Sajana (1994) 
 Pathbhrashtha (1994) 
 Insaan Bana Shaitan (1992) 
 Ajooba Kudrat Ka (1991) 
 Aakhiri Cheekh (1991) as Samuel David
 Hatyarin (1991) 
 Shitani Ilaaka (1990)
 Daata (1989) as Inspector Rao
 Mirza Ki Shaadi (1989) 
 Khooni Murdaa (1989) as Inspector Rakesh Chopra
 Purani Haveli (1989) as Sunil
 Padosi Ki Biwi (1988)  
 Awam (1987) as Surender Jagrathan
 Pyar Kiya Hai Pyar Karenge (1986) 
 Babu (1985) as Prem
 Mehak (1985) as Deepak Parashar
 Tawaif (1985) as Sulaiman
 Meetha Jehar (1985)  
 Maan Maryada (1985) as Inspector Ajay Kumar
 Sharaabi (1984) as Inspector Anwar
 Maqsad (1984) as Groom
 Kaun? Kaisey? (1983) as Rakesh Rai
 Muqaddar Ki Baat (1983) 
 Nikaah (1982) as Wasim Ahmed
 Waqt Ke Shehzade (1982) as Shankar
 Apna Bana Lo (1982) as Deepak
 Patthar Ki Lakeer (1982) 
 Armaan (1981) 
 Shradhanjali (1981) as Amit Kumar
 Sannata (1981)  
 Pyar Ki Manzil (1981)  
 Aap To Aise Na The (1980) as Vikram Chawla
 Insaaf Ka Tarazu (1980) as Ashok Sharma

Producer

 Achha Bura  (1983) as Producer

Second Unit Director or Assistant Director

 Bhumika - The Role (1977) as Location Assistant
 Nishant (1975) as Assistant Director
 Ankur (1974) as (Assistant Director & location in-charge)

References

External links

1952 births
Living people
Male actors from Pune
Indian male models
Indian male soap opera actors
Male actors in Hindi cinema
Male actors in Hindi television
20th-century Indian male actors
21st-century Indian male actors
Bigg Boss (Hindi TV series) contestants